Marvin Pieringer (born 4 October 1999) is a German footballer who plays as a forward for 2. Bundesliga club SC Paderborn, on loan from Schalke 04.

Career
Pieringer made his professional debut for Würzburger Kickers in the 2. Bundesliga on 6 January 2021, starting in the home match against FC St. Pauli. He scored a penalty in the 9th minute of the match, which finished as a 1–1 draw.

On 25 June 2021, Pieringer  agreed to join Schalke 04 on loan for the 2021–22 season with an option to make the move permanent. On 12 May 2022, Schalke exercised this option. On 28 July 2022, he joined SC Paderborn on a season-long loan.

Career statistics

Honours
Schalke 04
2. Bundesliga: 2021–22

References

External links
 
 

1999 births
Living people
German footballers
Association football forwards
SSV Reutlingen 05 players
SC Freiburg II players
Würzburger Kickers players
FC Schalke 04 players
SC Paderborn 07 players
2. Bundesliga players
Regionalliga players
People from Bad Urach
Sportspeople from Tübingen (region)
Footballers from Baden-Württemberg